Spenser: For Hire is an American crime drama series based on Robert B. Parker's Spenser novels. The series, developed for TV by John Wilder and starring Robert Urich, was broadcast on ABC from September 20, 1985, until May 7, 1988.

Production
The series ran on ABC from September 20, 1985, to May 7, 1988. Despite frequent time slot changes and occasional pre-emptions, the show garnered decent ratings. Location shooting ultimately led to the show's demise, with costs being cited as one of the main reasons why ABC cancelled it. Filmed largely in Boston, which was considered one of the show's strong points, it featured shots from many locations, even showing the harsh winters there (notably in the pilot). The show's  music was produced by Steve Dorff and Larry Herbstritt.

The series was estimated to have generated $50 million for the Commonwealth of Massachusetts.

Characters

Spenser

Spenser (Robert Urich) is the only name used for this character throughout the show. When introducing himself, he often says "Spenser with an 'S', like the poet." In "The Choice", it is revealed that Spenser fared poorly in a professional fight 12 years ago, but he still boxes and exercises at Henry Cimoli's Gym. He is well-read, often quoting poetry in everyday conversation, and is an excellent cook, often making recipes he picks up from watching Julia Child on his kitchen counter television.

Spenser lives in Boston and drives distinctive cars. His first is a mildly-worn out, ivy green '66 Ford Mustang, which is destroyed at the beginning of the second season. It is succeeded by a new 1987 Mustang 5.0 GT which, nine episodes later, is traded for a perfectly restored 1966 Mustang GT which gets banged up over the remaining run of the show. In the TV films, he drives a red Ford Probe in the first two, then switches to a burgundy red 1967 Ford Mustang fastback for the final two films.

Spenser carries a Beretta 9mm pistol and acknowledges being a Vietnam War veteran in the series' pilot episode. Spenser was also a former member of the Boston police force and occasionally cooperates with the BPD in the series.

In "Children of the Tempest Storm", Ms. Silverman reveals that she is pregnant with Spenser's child. The word abortion comes up when talking with her doctor, and is discussed throughout the episode, though often not using the word. Susan and Spenser discuss the issue and are at odds over the moral dilemma. Spenser, a Catholic, does not know if he can stay with Susan, though he loves her deeply, if she aborts. He believes it is only for her convenience that she would choose abortion. In the end, she has the abortion, and he brings her flowers. They silently affirm that the relationship will continue. After Susan leaves the show, ADA Rita Fiore becomes Spenser's love interest during the second season.

After his apartment goes up in flames at the start of the second episode, Spenser moves into a "firehouse", given to him by grateful local firefighters for saving the life of a firefighter at his apartment building. It is situated on the corner of River Street, near Mt. Vernon Square and Beacon Hill. In the second season, the Fire Department takes the station back and Spenser moves to a small top floor apartment in Charlestown, near the old Boston Navy Yard which he now uses as his office.

Hawk 

Hawk (Avery Brooks) is a smartly dressed enforcer. Though he is for hire, he has a code of ethics and assists Spenser. In the pilot episode ("Promised Land"), he and Spenser obviously have respect for each other, and he switches over from King Powers' (Chuck Connors) side to Spenser's side when he does not like Powers' actions. Hawk carries a Colt Python .357 Magnum as his weapon of choice.

Lt. Quirk 

Lt. Quirk (Richard Jaeckel) and Spenser have an uneasy, somewhat adversarial relationship, but often work together. In the episode "Heart of the Matter", Quirk suffers an angina attack and reluctantly accepts the fact that he must retire after 35 years on the force.

Episodes

The series consisted of three seasons (1985–1988) with a total of 66 episodes, and was followed by a series of four made-for-TV movies (1993–1995).

Home media
On June 28, 2005, Rykodisc released the four TV movies on DVD that were made following the cancellation of the weekly series.  In 2007, Rykodisc re-released each of them separately.

On August 26, 2014, Warner Bros. released the first season on DVD via their Warner Archive Collection.  This is a manufacture-on-demand (MOD) release, available through Warner's online store and Amazon.com. Warner's website explains that the initial disc run was pressed traditionally "to meet expected high consumer demand".  The second season was released on May 12, 2015. The third and last season was released on September 1, 2015.

Spin-offs and remakes
In 1989, after the show ended, Brooks starred in his own spin-off series, A Man Called Hawk.

From 1999 to 2001, Joe Mantegna played the detective in a series of three telemovies on A&E.

In an April 23, 2009 blog entry, Robert Parker stated that he was in talks with TNT to produce a remake of the series. However, Parker died in 2010 before these plans could take place.

The 2020 Netflix film Spenser Confidential is the first installment of a reboot of the series.

Notable guest stars
Angela Bassett
Patricia Clarkson
Chuck Connors
Ruby Dee
Laurence Fishburne
Sarah Michelle Gellar
Seth Green
Samuel L. Jackson
Eriq La Salle
Melissa Leo
Andie MacDowell
William H. Macy
Mako
Frances McDormand
Ed O'Neill
David Hyde Pierce
Ving Rhames
Jimmy Smits
Clarice Taylor

References

External links
 

1985 American television series debuts
1988 American television series endings
1980s American crime drama television series
American Broadcasting Company original programming
1980s American mystery television series
Television series by Warner Bros. Television Studios
Television shows based on American novels
Television shows set in Boston
Fictional portrayals of the Boston Police Department
American detective television series
Television shows filmed in Boston